Glutathione peroxidase 3 (GPx-3), also known as plasma glutathione peroxidase (GPx-P) or extracellular glutathione peroxidase is an enzyme that in humans is encoded by the GPX3 gene.

GPx-3 belongs to the glutathione peroxidase family, which functions in the detoxification of hydrogen peroxide. It contains a selenocysteine (Sec) residue at its active site. The selenocysteine is encoded by the UGA codon, which normally signals translation termination. The 3' UTR of Sec-containing genes have a common stem-loop structure, the sec insertion sequence (SECIS), which is necessary for the recognition of UGA as a Sec codon rather than as a stop signal.

Thiol specificity 
GPx-3 has a wide thiol specificity. The sources of reducing power for GPx-3 in vitro include GSH, cysteine, mercaptoethanol, and dithiothreitol. There is an evidence of effectiveness of homocysteine in reduction of GPx-3: GSH can be completely replaced by reduced homocysteine in vitro.

Changes during ontogeny 
In the rat blood plasma, the GPx-3 activity is low during the first two weeks after birth and rapidly increasing during transition from milk nutrition to solid food. Aging is accompanied by decrease in GPx-3 activity: in the blood plasma of rats it occurs around 23-26 months of age.

References

Further reading

External links 
 

EC 1.11.1
Antioxidants
Selenoproteins